Giovanni Tommasi Ferroni (born November 12, 1967 in Rome) is an Italian magic realism artist specializing in fantasy painting.

Biography 
Ferroni was born into a family of Tuscan artists, including his father Riccardo, grandfather Leone, and uncle Marcello from Pietrasanta. Ferroni's sister Elena was also a painter with whom Ferroni held joint exhibitions early on in his career.

In 1986, after graduating high school, he joined his father's atelier and studied at the Rome University 'La Sapienza'. His paintings depict a fantasy world that is inhabited by all kinds of mythological, historical and contemporary creatures.

Exhibitions 
 1989 Galleria AMG, Alassio (Italy)
 1991 Galleria Il Gabbiano, Rome (Italy)
 1995 Galleria L´Indicatore, Rome
 1997 Group exhibition European Figurative Art Steltman Galleries, Amsterdam
 1997 Steltman Galleries, Amsterdam
 1997 Galleria Il Gabbiano, Rome
 1998 Steltman Galleries, New York
 1998 Steltman Galleries, Amsterdam
 2000 Steltman Galleries, Amsterdam
 2002 Museo Sandro Parmeggiani, Ferrara (Italy)
 2002 Steltman Galleries, Amsterdam
 2003 Steltman Galleries, Amsterdam
 2004 Galerie Il Tempietto, Brindisi
 2005 Steltman Galleries, Amsterdam
 2006 February - March, Jan van der Togt Museum, Amstelveen
 2006 April, Gallery Davico, Torino
 2007 Museo Sandro Parmeggiani, Ferrara (Italy)
 2007 Tecna, Milaan (Italy)
 2007 Palazzo Antinori 'Per ... Bacco', Florence (Italy)
 2007 Censa (Italy)
 2007 August, Mongolia
 2007 Steltman Galleries, Amsterdam
 2011 Selective Art Paris

References

External links 
 
 http://www.tommasiferroni.it/Italiaanse 
 Tekne
 Tommasi Ferroni WebSite of Steltman Galleries.
 http://www.selective-artparis.com 

Living people
1967 births
20th-century Italian painters
20th-century Italian male artists
Painters from Rome
Italian male painters